Imperialibacter is a genus from the family of Flammeovirgaceae with one known species (Imperialibacter roseus).

References

Further reading 
 

Sphingobacteriia
Bacteria genera
Monotypic bacteria genera